A national consultation on President Augusto Pinochet's political program was held in Chile on 4 January 1978.  After being accused of human rights violations by the United Nations, Pinochet announced a national vote to confirm support for his policies.  The 'yes' field of the ballot featured a Chilean flag, while the 'no' field featured a solid black rectangle to nudge the vote in favor of Pinochet.

Results

References

Military dictatorship of Chile (1973–1990)
Referendums in Chile
Chile
Referendum
January 1978 events in South America